The 2011–12 season was the 101st season in Anorthosis Famagusta FC history and their 63rd consecutive season in Cypriot First Division, the top division of Cyprus football. It covered a period from 1 July 2011 to 30 May 2012.

Anorthosis Famagusta began the season in the second qualifying round of Europa League. Anorthosis faced the Georgian Cup winner for the 2010-2011 season, Gagra Georgia. In the first match, Anorthosis Famagusta defeated the Georgian club 3–0 in Andonis Papadopoulos stadium, with MVP Jan Rezek. After an unfavorable game, Anorthosis Famagusta was defeated 2–0 at the home stadium of Gagra, following some mistakes from the goalkeeper Matúš Kozáčik, especially at the first goal. In the third qualifying round, Anorthosis encountered FK Rabotnički Skopje. The first match in Antonis Papadopoulos Stadium was not the ideal for the Anorthosis; after the first 70 minutes the score was 0–0. FK Rabotnički eventually won the game 2-0. In the second match at the Philip II Arena, Anorthosis defeated FK Rabotnički 1–2 with goals from Jan Rezek and Cristovão Ramos. Rabotnički scored at the end of the second half with the score at 2–0 and the game went into extra time. After the match against FK Rabotnički, Dimitar Ivankov was released from Anorthosis with the reason that he could not help. After 9 weeks, an unannounced inspection conducted on groups that participated in the Europa League found all the squad of FK Rabotnički to be doped.

Season overview

August

Before the official start of Cypriot First Division Anorthosis announced the acquisition of the Poland national goalkeeper Adam Stachowiak on August 10. And one day before the first game of the season announced the acquisition of the first scorer all time with the national team of Cyprus Michalis Constantinou on August 27. The announcement: "The Anorthosis Famagusta announces the acquisition of international footballer Michael Constantine. Anorthosis welcomes Michael Constantine in our large family and wishes him every success. Michalis Konstantinou normally enrolled in CFA has joined officially today (26/08) in the Human Resources team and is available to the coach "

Anorthosis Famagusta opened their competitive season with a 0–1 win at the Dasaki Stadium in the first match of the Cypriot First Division against Ethnikos Achna on August 28. Jan Rezek scored after 78 minutes following an assist from Evandro Roncatto. Harder started the match the club from Famagusta, looking for the quick goal and the players showed the Ethnikos... looking to the presses. At 11' the "Lady" made a good first step to Laborde, who unleashed the possible right-left shot with the ball going just over the reach of Edin Nuredinoski. The beginning of the iteration was ... lazy to get the game .. fire from the 60 and then, when the coaches of both teams started the changes. At 60' the Ignatof and 66' the Pintseli tried to beat Kozáčik no avail intermixed to 63 Jan Rezek and 68'o Vučićević tried to beat Edin Nuredinoski, but to no avail. The image of the game said that the team that scores first will lock ... and the victory and lift that was first found its way to the networks in 78' after a corner kick and ... study were within the range of Ethnikos, the Roncatto made the shot and Jan Rezek view, with the ball ends up in the networks. In the remaining minutes did not change anything, the Ethnnikos can not be threatening to equalize and the match finally took Anorthosis to celebrate the victory in the First Division 1–0.

September
Anorthosis first division home match resulted in a 1–1 draw over local rivals Nea Salamina on September 11. After a dramatic game Julian Gray scored his first goal in division at the 1st minute of extra time with Right-footed shot. There everything in the match shows that Nea Salamina would take the victory, Anorthosis captain Giannis Okkas won a foul on a very good position. Marquinhos got the ball and after one amazing shot to the closed angle of Dejan Milić made  it 1–1 and gave to Anorthosis the 1 point.

At Match day 3 Anorthosis went to Tasos Markou to play against Enosis Paralimni on September 17. Anorthosis players found their way to the nets on the 69th minute with the goal of Bojan Markovski after a smart kickoff of Marko Andić from the left side. Players of Anorthosis lost many opportunities to score another goal after the red card which Kiassos received. In the final stages of the match threatened to take up the equalizer causing the murmur of the fans and complaints about the fairness of the victory of the opposing side.

The first classic derby of the season was on the 4th match day. Anorthosis Famagusta welcomed Omonia Nicosia at the Antonis Papadopoulos on September 25. After a good quarter of an hour for Anorthosis, Omonia was one that took the reins of the game and found a chance to open the score with Efrem with the goalkeeper avoids the goal. Shortly afterwards Anorthosis it was the team who lost the opportunities to score with Jan Rezek, Okkas and Roncatto with Antonis Georgallides said in both opportunities "no". At the end of the halftime. Stanislav Angelov lost the ball after the foul of Noel Kaseke with the referee to close their eyes and still continue the game. Noel Kaseke gave the ball to Makrides and after Makrides gave an assist to Freddy to score him 5th goal to the league. At the beginning of the second half Laban lost an incredible chance to score after a good shot who goes some mm out. At the 63rd minute new opportunity with Freddy! The shot was repelled by Kozatsik difficult to corner. At 67th minute a huge chance for 0–2. The Makrides gave the ball to Avraam. Avraam tried instead shot the ball to fool the goalkeeper and easily repelled the Kozatsik. The match ends with 3 good chances for Anorthosis first with laban from left to shoot, with Giorgallidis block the ball. and 2 shoots from side position from Michalis Konstantinou.

October
Anorthosis Famagusta defeated Alki Larnaca away 3–1 on October 2. Michalis Konstantinou scored his first two official goals in first Division and Okkas scored his first season goal for Anorthosis Famagusta. Michalis Konstantinou scored his two goals first one with corner kick of Marquinhos and the second one with pass of Giannis Okkas at 75th minute. Okkas scored his goal after a good personal effort with powerful Left-footed shot. reduced the score at the end of the second half with the goal of Arnal Llibert after a pass of Dragoş Firţulescu.

At Match day 6 Anorthosis Famagusta welcomed Aris Limassol at the Antonis Papadopoulos on October 17. Anorthosis lost 2 important points against Aris, for two times Anorthosis take the advantage to the score with 2 goals of Jan Rezek and Aris equalize the score first with the own goal of Jürgen Colin and after with a goal of Silvio González at 60th minute. At 60th minute Ventsislav Vasilev seen the second yellow card after a hard tackly to Vincent Laban.

Αt Match day 7 the second derby for Anorthosis. The club from Famagusta goes to Tsirion Stadium to play against AEL Limassol on October 23. The game ended 0-0. The shape of Levi showed his intentions, as the lift began with an aggressive 4-3-3, with their aggressive spikes Okka, Constantine and Rezek, while Pambos Christodoulou chose the common practice with two lines of defense and 4-5-1. However, the first proper stage of the match had the AEL, when the second minute the Vouoh found cafu in the area, the striker of the home team did the shot in motion, but Matus Kozacik repelled away. Anorthosis regained control center and Michalis Konstantinou in the 9th minute found Ioannis Okkas in the area, but the striker of "blue" sent the ball high out, trying to catch the shot to the air. Five minutes later, Michalis Konstantinou entered to the area between Edwin Ouon and Degra, he won and took the ball and tried to be foisted without seeing the hearth, sending the ball out. After the first quarter, both teams dropped the pace and lessen the good phases, since the next attempt worthy reference came in the 45th minute. Silas did kick off, the Dede came in loud and got Nailed the header, but the Matus Kozacik with good reflex kicked the ball. In the replay, two coaches did not change anything in squad and AEL took control in the center, with Monteiro even reaching the goal, after having made clear offensive foul on Jeffrey Leiwakabessy. He himself correctly pointed out the foul and did not measure the goals of AEL. Can the second half to the many missed opportunities classic, but it was obvious that time flowed in favor of the AEL, as players climb to the pitch and pressed more ... MVP: Matus Kozacik of Anorthosis was the man of the match. Can Degra have preserved the clean sheet, but the derby has not had to intervene, while the Matus Kozacik made two great saves and kept the "0".

At Match day the third derby for Anorthosis. The club from Famagusta goes to GSP Stadium to play against Apoel Nicosia on October 28. The game ended 0-0 second game to 0-0 for Anorthosis Famagusta in the row. Good pace in the first place, with both teams having a crossbar with Ailton and Ricardo Laborde. Apoel Nicosia took the reins of the repetition, with Ivan Tričkovski to lose the greatest opportunity. fatal Ioannis Okkas for Anorthosis, having lost two unique opportunities, while the guests finished the game with 10 players after the expulsion of Vincent Laban to the delays. Players Played with good pace and we had superiority in alternating first 45 minutes, with both teams to stay on the draw without goals (0-0) to reach the goal but in three cases. Specifically, the home team lost the opportunity to achieve goals ... from the dressing room when the crossbar stopped the attempt Ailton 3rd minute after the free kick Ivan Tričkovski. The visitors responded immediately, equaling the beams, the Ricardo Laborde at 10th minute, when the Colombian accepted any of Okkas. The captain of Anorthosis lost then unprecedented opportunity when completely untargeted She has marketed himself in shortly before the first half hour 29th minute, while the intermediate shot Ailton 14th minute resulted in his arms Matus Kozacik. Apoel began the second half better in the team of Ivan Jovanovic has possession of the ball and try to threaten mainly through set-phases, but can manage. Preponderance of the insipid Apoel since it could create opportunities for the Matus Kozacik frames. The first great chance to repeat the lost lift, with the protagonist again Okka, who was in a better position after the ball Evandro Roncatto, and a header sent the ball out. Ten minutes before the finale apoel created and lost a great opportunity when Ivan Tričkovski found Savvas Poursaitidis in the region, but the Matus Kozacik performed the surgery. Last good time in the match attempt of Nektarios Alexandrou, who spent just over the beams of Matus Kozacik.

November
Anorthosis Famagusta defeated Ermis Aradippou 1–0 in Andonis Papadopoulos on November 7. Jan Rezek opened the score at the 25th minute after a personal effort of the Colombian Ricardo Laborde from the left side. Many missed opportunities, with ten final stages of Roni Levi's team and only one apt, conscientious but completely harmless aggressively Mercury. Fourth victory and first since taking the Ronnie Levy for "great lady", which reached 16 points and fourth place on standings. MVP: Ricardo Laborde. The most active player in the game of Anorthosis and creator of goals scored by Rezek. The Colombian lost opportunities to scorer and anointed many troubled defense of Mercury, before leaving injured in the last minute.

Anorthosis Famagusta defeated Anagennisi Dherynia away 2–0 on November 19. Anorthosis confirmed the upward trend with an excellent display to beat Renaissance 2-0 thanks to goals from Ioannis Okkas the 40th minute and 69th in the Ricardo Laborde. The Colombian was a player, "key" for guests, since apart from the excellent goals, all incursions famagustian began his feet ... The struggle became aggressive "monologue" for Anorthosis, since in the fifth minute the Laborde got nice shots after individual effort and the ball stopped at the crossbar Mastro helpless to react. In the 24th minute came the second crossbar to lift when Okkas after a corner found himself in, grabbed the header, but again the crossbar "saved" the Renaissance. In the second half, Anorthosis showed to have put "leisurely" in the match with the Renaissance shyly coming to leverage, but in the 54th minute came the phase of "completed" in fact match. Pindonis silly way to try to block the free kick from the side Anorthosis, while yellow card already and rightly expelled by Marios Stamatis. So with 10 players, the lift continued to push for the second goal, but without much success. All this so that the best player of the match, the Laborde decided to take the game over... The Colombian came in 69th minute in the Dherynia and with a single shot "lightning" Mastro, writing the 2–0. MVP: The Laborde was "driving" force behind Anorthosis at the center, created the first goal and scored the second goal of the amazing "Lady".

On 23 November 2011 D. Ellinas group signed a contract with Anorthosis to build new offices for Antonis Papadopoulos Stadium. The old offices of the stadium will be joint area outside the locker room, journalistic theory, clinics and other. The cost is €400,000 but the company D. Ellinas group will build the offices for free in exchange for advertisements on the Anorthosis side.

Anorthosis Famagusta Lost by AEK Larnaka in andonis papadopoulos with score 1–0 on November 23. With the Gonzalez scorer and the leading Alexandre Negri and penalties which beat AEK won the derby in Antonis Papadopoulos. AEK lost the best opportunities in the first half despite the fact that the lift had possession and controlled the pace. The goal came early in the replay at the 52nd minute after a superb effort past Gonzalez and Kozatsik. Anorthosis reacted immediately, won the 54th penalty minutes in his hand de Cler, but the Rezek has the opportunity tonight to Alexandre Negri surprising drop in the corner and ward. Anorthosis press but then Negri was unbeaten on counterattacks while AEK was dangerous. Shortly before the end Jason Demetriou punished by Leontios Tratto a red card because obviously something he said after the intent of the referee to show yellow. The end of the game found the AEK fans to celebrate the first victory of their team at the Antonis Papadopoulos Anorthosis.

December
Anorthosis Famagusta defeated Olympiakos Nicosia 2–1 away on December 3.  Anorthosis got one more victory away from the "Antonis Papadopoulos", Anorthosis beat olympiakos, with scorer Okkas and Rezek .H Lady who showed once again he gets what he wants right away after reacting defeat by AEK. Olympiacos reduced the Mércio. With ten and a team of Nicosia after the red card of Carlos André. With three strikers started the game of the lift. Top Okkas and more back Konstantinou and Rezek. With the move of the Israeli coach of the Lady wanted to chase the quick goals. Olympiakos side had defensive orientations from the first minute. MVP: Giannis Okkas with goals scored and mobility that had the game.

The second victory of the home celebrated the Anorthosis, beating 2–0 in the derby with rival Apollon Limassol on December 10. Scorer of the great lady Marquinhos (57') and Konstantinou (93') after phase started Roncatto. The two clubs had a half that excelled in the game, to the first half, Apollon, the second half, Anorthosis. Step for the first group, after the second consecutive victory in this year's only the second year to the "Antonis Papadopoulos". Moderate to poor spectacle with powerful fights and few good phases in front of the two foci composed the scene in the first half of the derby 'Andonis Papadopoulos. "Apollon threatened in the early stages of the match with Núñez, with the Spaniard lost the greatest opportunity of the first 45 minutes at the 15 minute. Very few things offensively for Anorthosis, with Laborde to make some personal effects and the absence of Jan Rezek is more than evident. It is significant that the first half ended with a final effort of Apollon and none for Anorthosis. Slow the tempo of the match in the first minutes of the second half, with Anorthosis have possession of the ball, but does not create opportunities ... until the 57th minute, when the players "great lady" namely Roncatto, Okkas and Marquinhos, combined wonderful and the last shot with the movement sent the ball into the net of Chvalovsky. The hosts maintained the initiative, lost opportunities mainly for Roncatto the second goal, with Apollon are completely harmless aggressively. In the third minute of delay Anorthosis doubled the termini with Konstantinou again after phase started from his feet somewhere Ronkato and entered the "end credits" in the confrontation. MVP: Evandro Roncatto. The Brazilian had great presence, from his feet and started two goals and created several problems in defense of Apollon.

Anorthosis came strong in the match against Ethnikos Achna FC succeeded preceded by 2–0 in the first half and from there had not been difficult to reach the third victory in the "Antonis Papadopoulos" and to bring some more on top on December 16 Anorthosis scorers was Ricardo Laborde with a brilliant free-kick and Vincent Laban after an assist of Okkas. Roni Levi's team created several opportunities to score, with Konstantinou showed once again that he can't help the "Lady" but the Roncatto and Laborde were involved in all phases that took Anorthosis to the focus of Nuredinoski. The final 2–0, however, are not entirely indicative of the image of the race, as Achna pressed enough to lift the first half, especially, and could have achieved any goal, whether it was more aptly Pavisevits, but this was hopelessly alone in attack. MVP: The Lavorde "unlock" the game with brilliant free kick performed in the 15th minute, while permanently employed to defend the Achnas.

January
Follow the victories and the upward trend during the days of Roni Levi the Anorthosis, who prevailed 3–0 in the Famagustan derby, against town rival Nea Salamina. Substantial and effective "great lady" got the three points with beautiful goals from Okkas 34', Laborde 70' and Angelov 85' on January 7. Anorthosis Started the match better, which was first possibility to score with Sielis 4'. Then the Nea Salamina balance the match and came close to score with Julian Gray 33', with both groups consumed the greater part of the first half in personal duels in the midfield area. The answer came directly Anorthosis and the amazing goal Okkas 34', group of Roni Levi was able to get ahead in the score 0–1, score which remained until the final whistle of the first half. In the second part of the match left to Anorthosis the opponent, who tried to become more threatening, but to accomplish this, the absences can particularly affect the performance of the team of Steve Constantinides. Anorthosis ... managed to lock the game with Laborde 70' to utilize an ideal place the pass of Angelov and score the 0–2. Somewhere after all were the Nea Salamina no longer had the mental resources to react with the remaining minutes to obtain formal. Indeed, Anorthosis was successful and the third goal Angelov (0-3) to end another perfect aggressive effort "great lady" and forms the 0–3. MVP: Okkas. The captain of Anorthosis ... hurt the team that made the first steps in football scoring a great goal (fourth overall in the league) deemed final and the outcome of the match.

On January 12 Anorthosis announcement the sign of contracts with the national Georgian football player Kvirkvelia.

The fifth consecutive victory celebrated the Anorthosis, a 1–0 against Enosis Paralimni. Laban goalscorer 76' with apt penalty try, with Anorthosis not impressive, but gets the point. With the 10 "purple" after the expulsion of Imschoot 33' on January 14. Harder began the game looking to Anorthosis the lead early in the score, but to do it. Striker monologue to Anorthosis the largest piece of the first half, with players playing the Enosis Paralimni closed and trying to be threatened by counterattacks. The Laban 5', Burchill 16' Laborde 20' and Alivodic 27' lost the best opportunities in the first half hour. The numerical balance changed after elimination with second yellow card Imsiot (33'), with the hosts then push further, but struggling against the multi-faceted line of defense "purple." The Okkas 45' he lost his last chance of the first half, with both teams going scoreless in the locker room without goals. From where I stayed in first place and continued in the second two groups, with the difficulty to lift the creative part of the game and the Enosis Paralimni had very good inhibitory function. Indeed, the guests could precede the score, but was unlucky when the beam stopped the shot Kolanis 66'. Marquinhos 69' and Rezek 72' then threatened to Anorthosis. Eventually the players "great lady" managed to get ahead in the score after the apt performance penalty of Laban 76'. The penalty was careless after playing on the Alivodic on the Laborde. The hosts could double their finishes, but Konstantinou(79', 82') missed two good opportunities. MVP: Laban. Among the most active players of Anorthosis and only goal scorer of the match.

Anorthosis was able to get big 1–0 win against Omonia Nicosia. Gold Roncatto goal scorer in 84th minute on January 21. He played with 10 players for half, was against the tradition in GSP. An excellent and cooled at the tactical level Anorthosis ended in the negative based on tradition with Omonia. and with the goal of Evantro Evandro Roncatto(85') took the victory 1–0. With ten of the first part of the "great lady" after the second yellow in Andić, lag behind the previous derby "the greens." With good pace started the match with both teams alternating supremacy. In good time the first game with Kozatsik managed to walk away before Avraam(4'), while the delayed Okkas features a counterattack Anorthosis (14'). Laborde (19') attempted with the shot, sending the ball just over the beams. Closed longest game in the first half, with both groups to be quite good inhibitory function, thereby missing the big stages in front of two places. The Efrem (33') he threatened to shoot target not found, while a weak Okkas header saw the ball ends up in his arms Georgallides(42'). Shortly before the completion of the first time the numerical balance changed the match, when Andić after a foul on Efrem, he saw ... yellow, the second of the game and was eliminated. The Bosnian defender should not be charged on the first yellow, since it seemed to make theater, as considered by Stelios Tryphonos. From early in the second half Omonia tried to push the advantage of the numerical advantage, but the greatest chance until that point of the mach has lost the Roncatto (51'), who shot from the level of penalty and he sent the ball out . Kvirkvelia (61') shortly after entering the game from great vantage sent the ball over the Georgallides. The answer came with Omonia the crossbar to direct foul of Avraam (63'), while Salatić header (64') came out slightly. Even with less Anorthosis player with good inhibitory function is not allowed in Omonia be particularly threatening, and again went on the offensive foul with Laborde to result in his arms Georgallides. The mistake did not cost Kozatsik to Anorthosis after the shot Da Silva (80') passed over the beams. The Roncatto (85') managed to find a goal after a superb action preceded by Laborde and put the score in front Anorthosis. The third and last minutes late Avraam attempted the shot, the ball and to oppose the resulting corner. MVP: Ricardo Laborde. The Colombian made them all on the pitch. Troubled the defense of Omonia, as illustrated by the phase of the goals, and helped a lot and the defense with quick returns throughout the duration of the match.

On January 28 Anorthosis announcement the sign of contracts with the Greece football player Giorgos Makris from Atromitos.

February
On February 2 Anorthosis Famagusta agreed with the Moroccan international striker Jaouad Zairi. Specifically, he agreed with Anorthosis to sign a contract until next summer, with the option to renew the partnership for the next 1+1 years.

Crime and punishment. Anorthosis depended once again confined to the appetites of Laborde, but the Colombian ace expelled in the 67th minute and Aris the advantage four minutes after taking one valuable for him to win 1–0 on February 4. The decision of the referee Christos Nicolaides was instrumental in the evolution of the race, since Laborde is the number one risk for rival foci after the elimination of the "Lady", which was better up to that point, they actually threatened. The elimination of Laborde then, but the fault of the match was Colin, since the 71' not colluded with Kozáčik and "gave" the goal of victory in the Kingdom. He stayed at 27 degrees the "Lady" and risk losing valuable ground in the race for first place. On the other hand, three points may seem "gold" in the effort of Aris to remain in First Division.

Anorthosis Famagusta defeated by AEL Limassol On antonis Papapdopoulos on February 12. A good pace and alternating leadership contest began. The game was balanced in the first 20 minutes, without any stands of the two groups. The first major opportunity arose to Anorthosis when Okkas won a penalty reversal by Carlitos. The Vincent Laban (24') but was unable to send the ball into the net against the Degra, the Argentine goalkeeper proved once again this year unbeaten from the eleven steps. The "galazokitrinoi" after the penalty had already lost the psychology on their side and reached a breath away from the goal, but the crossbar stopped a shot from the side position Monteiro (34'). Until the first half was not created another great opportunity to ... 0–0 to seal the efforts of the players of both teams. The two teams alternated possession of the ball and the superiority early in the second half. Without getting specific risks in their play, they tried to be especially threatening to some individual efforts, but struggled to create great opportunities in front of their homes and the Degra, Kozáčik. Eventually the AEL Limassol was able to get ahead in the score ... pitched ringing in one phase, the Dosa Júnior (84') to be anointed scorer with a header after a corner Monteiro. Anorthosis then pressed in order to reach the equalizer, with Okkas to neglect immediately after (84') and Dédé stopped him in an exemplary manner. The 0-1 remained until the end of the AEL Limassol and celebrated his first victory in the history of the "Antonis Papadopoulos", but also the loneliness at the top of the standings.

The many significant absences bent to Anorthosis, which reached an important 2–0 victory at Apoel Nicosia, thanks to two goals from the first quarter (11', 13' Roncatto) on February 19. He stayed alive so the hunt for the title. In Lyon had left the team Jovanovic. Anorthosis entered dynamically in derby, took a significant lead by 13' and then left the premises APOEL, who had the ball, but not many clear chances to avoid defeat. Anorthosis showed unaffected by the number of absences at the beginning and started the game strong, taking the reins from the first minute. Indeed, already in the 4' had lost his first good opportunity to Roncatto, who had all the offensive against the absence of Okkas, Rezek and Michalis Konstantinou. Chiotis reacted correctly in this case, with the hosts threatened again with Roncatto (after the Marquinhos assist), which was delayed and could not seem threatening. The superiority of the "Lady" and bore fruit in a three-minute team Roni Levi became strong lead, and was preceded by 2–0. At 11' the Zairi achieved its maiden goal with the shirt of Anorthosis, utilizing a stunning, turn kick (the ball and found the beam) the balls Tzanisio Martins. And at 13' the Roncatto, who had warned the missed opportunities, he left "unpunished" in childish mistake Oliveira. With the 2-0 Anorthosis had achieved its goal and then made sure to keep more of kekteimenon. APOEL took the initiative, had possession of the ball and tried to rejoin the game with a goal, but had no clear phases. MVP: Zairi. "Shout" with the appearance that deserves to be in the lineup and with no absences so ... He achieved a great goal, had more opportunities, disrupting defenses APOEL continuously.

Anorthosis won 1–0 on "Famagusta" Mercury in the 22nd match of the Okkas scorer (44') on February 26. Better throughout the race, the "Lady" with Hermes to resist vigorously until the end of the race. Mathematically relegated and Mercury. Performance for a role in first place with an Anorthosis to have the absolute supremacy gipediki after he had possession of the ball players of Roni Levi ... to circulate around the hearth of Brooks trying to break off the defense of Mercury and violate the fireplace the goalkeeper's team Aradippou. The Okkas in 14' tried to shoot Brooks repel. Then the phase of Zaire did the shoot with Brooks to neutralize a corner. The shot of Laban (27') Okkas (36') found the target with "Lady" to insist on the same tempo and Mercury team to defend en masse. In 44' is utilized Okkas kick off the far in the area and making use of the wrong exit to Brooks header opened the scoring and shaped the outcome of the first 45 minutes. A similar picture in the second half to Anorthosis impose the rhythm of looking for the second goal. The Marquinhos free kick at 51' with Brooks to turn away in the corner then off to shoot over the beams through the area. The Rezek a header missed another opportunity in 67'. Then Hermes sought to rise to 83 in Catiaga attempts to shoot the height of the large area and to repel Kozáčik constant. The dystocia Anorthosis gave rights to ermes ... was looking to equalize. Mercury claimed the equalizer at the end without succeeding in getting the Anorthosis at the end of a stressful but it useful to then win with a score the same as the first round. The team Aradippou demoted and mathematics, as did the Renaissance a day before. MVP: The scorer Okkas gave the solution to dystocia with aggressive goals in 44' and the overall performance helped his team lagged in the ... goals.

March
Anorthosis took a 1–0 victory against Anagennisi Dherynia, with the goal from Lavorde on 15' minute on March 5. Crescendo of missed opportunities for the "grande dame" with Laborde to make up a party to withdraw due to injury or undue relaxation in the last 20 minutes that could cost you. Moderate pace in the first half of the match, with Anorthosis to press and after he had a good time with Rezek 12', managed to get ahead in the score with Laborde 15' with the Colombian scoring after the repulse of a Mastrou on the shot of Rezek. Anorthosis continued the momentum, the Renaissance merely a passive role, with the Laborde 20', Rezek 22' have two other good moments. The Rezek 37' near-scoring after a superb Laborde unstoppable energy, the Colombian taking the baton in lost opportunities in the latter stages of the first part 38',42'. The same setting and repeat Anorthosis to have absolute control over the match and lost two consecutive opportunities with Okkas 46',47' and the Andic 51', Laban 54' and Rezek 63'. In the last 20 minutes and especially after the exit of Laborde (forced change) Anorthosis lost the aggressiveness and speed ... threw in performance. The looseness came close to cost, by Milan Belić (82') having a good time for guests, like Shaka Bangura in the last minute of normal time the match. Eventually the 1-0 remained until the end of Anorthosis with anxiety to celebrate the victory in a game that could clean it up sooner. MVP: Ricardo Laborde. The Colombian returned several appetite after absence for punishment, with its good performance to seal it with a certain artistic goals and actions. The defense of the Renaissance especially in the first part with anything they could to limit the action of Laborde.

The ranked unattractive AEK Larnakas managed to stop Anorthosis and could not get the victory, since players of "Lady" is not shown in any case that is in the battle title and deserve to have hope on March 11. While the AEK was better in most of the race, managed to equalize quickly scored Kvirkvelia the third minute with a superb finish of the young Kyprianou at 34', while the Anorthosis had opportunities to get the win, but made even a modest emergence of a critical match.

fair victory with Anorthosis 2–1 against Olympiakos Nicosia in Andonis Papadopoulos even scoring two goals in the first half on march 17. Only managed Olympiakos Nicosia was to reduce. I did not ... take the Anorthosis to lose, everyone knew that the "Lady" and from the first second came determined to get their 3points. So when the "home team" took the reins of the game, they managed their first good step in the 8' to open the scoring after the ball vertical Marquinhos back defending the Olympicakos, Laborde managed Ernestas Šetkus to exit the, She has marketed the put team in place ... guide. Once the "Guests" somehow managed to balance the match came in Janício Martins 37' to make the 2 - 0, giving precedence to the most serious team, taking advantage anampoumpoula defense of "Mavroprasinon" tried and both groups the start of the second half to be imposed. By completing one hours play, however, the rate fell. So we got to 78' and a phase that does not smell goal came the reduction of scores from the Olympiakos, was the free kick from the left, higher than all the cast with a header and Duarte made his 2 to 1. In the remaining minutes, the Anorthosis could achieve any goal, Olympiacos was harmless, the goal never came and so the 2-1 was meant to be and the result. MVP: The Laborde for both goals scored and for general picture.

Cold shower for Anorthosis at the end, the "Lady" had control of the game for 91 minutes, went ahead on 26 minutes with Rezek, lost opportunities, had control, but the game ends when the referee whistles, this is believed to Apollo "stole" the extent, with the goal of Joao Paulo on 92' on March 25. In the early stages came close to us "asleep." Both teams were trying to impose their rhythm, more than two wings. And after the first phase came in 4', the next was the goal in 26'. In the first essential step, Anorthosis opened the scoring. He was shot in the vertical axis of Okkas, found a place in the right Rezek, he had time to sprint to defend Aleš Chvalovský Apollon and the expense to do with viewing the 1 - 0. In the next phase, a little lack to mate goals of the "Lady" when saliva came face-to-face with Chvalovsky, passed the Goalkeeper of Apollon, but delayed the plasma found Merkis and then to the right beam. Ten minutes had to pass to become a stage, and that Anorthosis when saliva found on the left with the 30 meters long pass to Rezek, he downed a nice ball, but his shot was blocked and the lukewarm Aleš Chvalovský. In the final two minutes of the first half, Apollon came close to call when the first phase, trolling kickoff Cissokho shot from the left, found the root of the right spar Kozatsik, while the second Stavrou from the shaft, just outside from the large area, got the shot but the ball ended up out. With the kickoff in the second half, the picture of the two groups were almost identical to the first half. Apollon tried to raise the lines and push, ineffective and even though the Anorthosis was more dangerous, as he found space on the counterattacks. And while all showed that 1 - 0 for the Anorthosis and it was finished, came Joao Paulo, taking advantage of the head of Merkis, he has marketed by Kozatsik, equaling to 1 to 1 and even more difficult the task of Anorthosis in the playoffs.

The quick goals with Anorthosis with Kvirkvelia on 4' are not conditions stop the AEL, which came immediately to equalize with Dede on 17'. But in the second half neither team risked and stayed 1-1 until the end on March 31. Best start he could not imagine Anorthosis, which took precedence even before completion of the fourth minute of the game! The extraordinary effort by the right Rezek completed kickoff in the area where the unattended Dutton Kvirkvelia made it 1–0 with a strong shot. The quick goals gave no feathers on the "Lady", as the AEL balancing the game and immediately warned the Anorthosis with a possible long shot of Monteiro 12'. Two minutes after the hosts lost opportunity for the classic 2–0, Rezek danced when the opposing defense, the nearby plasma but was repelled by the hard Degra 14'. The equalizer for FC did not take long to come but had to make a mistake in assessing the Kozatsik foul. The Dede just pushed the ball up close, after the repulse of the unstable Anorthosis goalkeeper, who was not a good day, since in many cases was unstable and offered no confidence in his teammates. In one of the outputs of a bad foul by Gilberto was fortunate enough not to Anorthosis a player of AEL towards the ball to send it into the net (38'). Two minutes after plasma Baby after all of Carlitos just passed out, the last phase of the good first half ended with imichronou.To clear possession of the ball for the AEL (close to 65%), but to repeat Anorthosis has improved in this area, but do not rise much above 40%. The repetition, however, the phases were fewer. In a three-minute-fire, AEL had three chances to get ahead: the Monteiro came to counterattack, but sentrare wrong in the area over the Kozatsik while his teammates were unmarked 58'. New error Kozatsik no cost to kick off the "Lady" since she managed to fix Colin 59'. One minute after the failed Dickson keeps control over a great deep ball into the area 60'. Even fewer stages in the last half hour, with Monteiro be located in the 74', but delayed and Rezek to lose the best chance of recurrence with Anorthosis header to repel Degra 76'. The Rezek and penalties sought in the process but that the Argentine goalkeeper does not seem to touch the 79' One minute before the Marios Nicolaou tried to "hang" by far the Kozatsik unstable, but he repelled difficult.

April
With one goal in 5 minutes of each half and top Laborde again, Anorthosis went through the empty GSP with 1-2 5' Rezek, 50' Laborde / 67' Manduca) and limited the title hopes of APOEL, increasing their own chances of finding the next year in Europe, regardless Cup on April 8. Anorthosis no longer have to wait what will happen in the Cup, so it knows whether to go to Europe and the fourth championship since now arrived at a short distance from Omonia third. Return to Cyprus League after a stunning career in Champions League was abnormal for APOEL, who did not follow the "double" on the Concorde last week. After this defeat, the "orange blues" stayed five points behind the AEL, which compete in the next two games. Anorthosis scored its first opportunity in a superb counterattack the Lavorde unfolded, with a point shot Rezek be foisted on 0–1. The "Lady" was succeeded by the early goal and then left the initiative in APOEL. The "orange blues" had possession of the ball (58% -42% in the first half), but that was meaningless. Guests vindicated the choice to wait for the opponent as little threatened in the first half. Just had two chances APOEL at this time. In 30' Adorno found in the vertical ball Marcinho who untargeted She has marketed, with Ailton not enough time to make close-up view. At 41' Manduca amarkaristos got good header, but passed out. The scene was repeated in the repetition of the APOEL keep the ball and Rehabilitation to transform into the first goal of a good time. It was at 50' when Okkas and Ronkato changed the ball before it reaches the Laborde, who after a nice individual action beat Chian, taking the 0–2. After the second goal APOEL awakened and began to push and lose some opportunities. Foremost exponent of the Manduca, but the biggest missed opportunity is Solari, whom he took a position Ailton a Wed Wed the plasma but went just over the crossbar 64'. In the crossbar and went to try the Jorge at 63', but the stage was as void, because his hand had been a Portuguese defense. The pressure bore fruit with APOEL Manduca to exploit parallel with plasma kickoff of Solari 67'. The Brazilian had a new chance in 78', but the header went out. Despite the decrease, however, the score and ball possession in favor of APOEL, Anorthosis held without major problems, the 1–2, taking a great victory in GSP! MVP: Laborde. It was through both phases of goals! The first goal gave ready Rezek in the second he danced APOEL defense and scored.

Even with ten players (Laborde miscarriage at 77'), Anorthosis defeat again empty GSP winning by 1–2 with goals, Omonia in the delays! on April 21. The "Lady" was preceded with Marquinhos in 60', with Omonia reaching the equalizer with Aloneftis (84'), but not to keep. Although a numerical disadvantage, Anorthosis arrived at yet another "double" after the tremendous energy of Okka with the Roncatto score at 93'. The chief exponent of the aggressive actions of Aloneftis, Omonia tried to get his head to score in the first half, which, however, the more conventional opportunities belonged to Anorthosis. Very nice plasma Aloneftis just passed the bar next to the first great moment of the race (7'), the "Lady" to respond immediately. Alabi, Karipidis and Margaça confused in corners and on contact with Rezek shot and sent the ball just over the crossbar (10'). At 23' the Rezek shoot through the area, but the ball found in colleges of defenders, with Anorthosis to waste a good opportunity. Suspected opportunity in this 31' long shot with the Aloneftis passed over the bar. Anorthosis protested a penalty phase Lavorde found in the ground after pushing the Margaça (35'). At 44' the Laborde found Kvirkvelia the left, the great kick-off of which reached the Marquinhos within the region, the strong shot but just passed beside the bar. The defensive function of the Concorde was a question mark before the game, the phase of the 49' but the head-Ronkato found in a location Wed Wed Rasheed Alabi opened the exemplary cut and clean the ball. The hosts responded with a good chance in 57' when he found Eftem, Bergougnoux in the area but the shot was good and went over the bar. As against the APOEL, so opposite in Omonia, Anorthosis struck first (against the "galazokitrinous" course had been too early), opening the scoring on 60 minutes. From foul in with Kyriakos Lavorde bar area near the line outs, came in 0–1 with the Colombian to perform and  Marquinhos to score with a header. The goal gave wings to the guests, who could create a hazard in 64' when Lavorde found in beautiful Bali Rezek only in the heart of the region, the Czech Republic to lose control. From Laborde started or spent most aggressive action Anorthosis, but even a foolhardy Colombian brought the elimination of the 77', and when he had a card in possible makrarisma Aloneftis and rightly saw a second yellow. A miscarriage that changed the flow of the match against Omonia to raise the blood pressure and reaches the plasma equalize the best player in the match, the Aloneftis (84'). Four minutes after the Aloneftis found near the rollover, but failed to score. Anorthosis but had not said the last word. An amazing energy of the Okka 93' brought the second goal scorer in the Anorthosis Roncatto. New "Double" for the "Lady". MVP: Roncatto. The more stable in performance score of the player, there was quite menacing and helped very creative piece. He succeeded and the winning goal.

After the great "double" "Omonia regained third place in scoring, putting the tombstone of Anorthosis title dreams, which fell to fourth place. Ben Dayan 43', Alves 67', 74' and Bergougnoux 89' the scorers of Omonia. With a last minute problem began Omonia, with Efrem to be off the mission because of injury, as informed by "green" before the match starts. That went well in the derby was Anorthosis, which had the psychology of consecutive victories in the playoffs. Once in the 3' Okkas found in the area and fell to the ground, but the branding of Karipidis to justify the suggestion penalty requested by the home team. The phase stirred protests from side Anorthosis that was overturned by the early numerical balance, the "Lady" to be left with ten men for 17 minutes after marking hard from behind, Janício Martins tackly with both feet Aloneftis. Needless possible Janicio marking the center of the court, to the point that there was no danger. Despite the expulsion, the Anorthosis kept the reins of the match and was one that had the best chances in the first half: a miscarriage before the shot with just Evandro Roncatto outs 13' and then with a double long shot Evandro Roncatto and the new shot Okkas outside the region, to repel the Georgallides in both cases. Omonia showed early weakness to exploit the numerical advantage, but after the first half hour took possession of the ball and took the initiative. He could, however, to make dangerous phases. There was, however, highly effective, since seized the first opportunity that was: a foul by-side position near the line-outs performed by the Aloneftis, Ben Dayan header Nailed formed with the 0-1 (43'). Ronny Levy did not make changes after the elimination of Tzanisio, shifting the defense Marquinhos. At 52' but passed instead of the Jan Rezek and put Marko Andić in ... position, defense, restoring the Marquinhos center. Anorthosis was held at the beginning of the second half, but it was meaningless, since Omonia was tightly closed and did not accept phases. Neither created phases guests, but were highly effective in this game. So the second essentially doubled the chance of the finishes, putting ... and end the game. The Christofi was unable to win the Kozatsik from repelling unstable and whose failure to prosecute defense came near the plasma Alves for 0-2 67'. The Brazilian striker needed goals to regain confidence and scored a second goal, making the ball Spougkin took him to a location Wed Wed the 74' 0–3. Omonia came in fourth and goal, giving dimensions triumph in winning the Bergougnoux 89'.

May
With the goal of Babe 74' the AEL ascended the throne of Cyprus football after 44 years. The Angola player gave the victory to his team's 1–0 against Anorthosis, sent his friends to AEL 7 skies to win the sixth championship in history. The AEL was the team entered the stadium having the opposite story ... but to lift not only to resist strongly but also seeks to ... acts of the goal. From the first minutes both teams showed their desire to compete with aggressive approaches. Before completing one minutes Okkas race found in the area of the AEL Jrunior to catch up and the ball ends up in the hands of Degra. AEL's response came in 3 minutes when Dede tried a header to open the scoring in the firing position to avoids Laban on the line. The AEL has tried to impose its rhythm on the lift to wait and grow gradually. The Okkas at 14' left behind the defense of AEL and shot through the area sent the ball out. Four minutes later Gilberto with distant-shooting technician marked the crossbar of Kozatsik in a space that "galazokitrini" gipediki had the ascendancy. At 19' from near the Dickson took advantage of the defensive line inactive Anorthosis at the heart of the area and shot sent the ball into the right crossbar Kozatsik. The Baby with "warm" impossible shots not worried Anorthosis goalkeeper in remarkable unique opportunity in the third quarter of the race. In 35' Vincent Laban lost the unique opportunity through the area after the Roncatto assists to give precedence to Anorthosos the Degra repel. The last chance of the first part of the Dixon header sent the ball out. The AEL went into the second half to win peismomenoi and 50' by Dickson lost his first chance with a diagonal shot. Sato 57' leader Nikolaos long shot sent the ball out. At 74' the Babe after switching the ball to Voou came in and left-Way opened the scoring. In 81' Silas to shoot was not able to double its goal of AEL. In the last minutes of Limassol team kept the score in favor of and in conjunction with the victory of Omonia in GSP was crowned champion of Cyprus for the 2011–2012 season.

Two "catastrophic" errors from the Anorthosis defense brought two goals and APOEL first victory on the "essential" to 2-1 this year in "Antonis Papadopoulos". Scorers for APOEL Marcinho in the 37', Solari at the 60th minute, while Okkas reduced immediately after the 61st minute. Anorthosis went too hard in the match and took the reins of the game, creating the first opportunity, but Lavorde and Roncatto could not find the target, so until the 30th minute, the "Lady" could not translate its superiority in goals. This succeeded in APOEL 37th minute when Jurgen Colin made a serious mistake, actually gave the ball to Marcinho, he went and Gavriel Constantinou he has marketed and targeted. APOEL preceded the goal Marcinho, although the lift was better in most of the first half, had the initiative, but it was cool to the last pass. By the end of the first half could not threaten Anorthosis and the score was 0–1 at halftime. On several occasions, missed the good phases, although in the 53rd minute Soouza nearly scored when a foul ball that performed oppose Gavriel Constantinou and started following the outbreak of Anorthosis drove a corner away. In the 60th minute came the second mistake from the defense side Anorthosis Andic as the "gift made" in Tričkovski the ball, he spent the Gavriel Constantinou turned the ball into an empty Solari and sent her home in the nets making it 2-0 favor of APOEL. In the next phase, the Okkas reduced to a 2-1 Anorthosis, as did the nice Marquinhos while all the leader of the "Lady" was cast in the path of the ball and scored. By the end of the race, tried to Anorthosis the pressure on the tie, but kept the APOEL 2–1 in favor of and got his first victory this year against the "Lady".

Club

Coaching staff

Club hierarchy

Kit

|
|
|

Official sponsors

Mission Sponsors
 Cyta Mobile Vodafone
•  Betfair
•  Puma
•  Laiki Bank Championship
•  SAPO
•  D.Ellinas holdings
•  Balla.com.cy

Sponsors
 Cyta Mobile Vodafone
•  Betfair
•  LTV
•  Cyta
•  Coop Famagusta
•  Coop Karpasias
•  Coop Makrasykas
 
 Simplex
•  Cosmos Insdrance
•  Landas Colour
•  STR8
•  Coca-Cola
•  Petrolina
•  Interwetten
•  Poker.gr

Supporters
 TGI Fridays
•  GGS
•  Ydrogios
•  Carrera Sunglasses
•  ART HOME lisette
•  Carlsberg
•  SYM

Source: Anorthosis.com

Competitions

Laiki bank League

Classification

Playoffs table
The first 12 teams are divided into 3 groups. Points are carried over from the first round.

Results by round

Current squad
Last Update: April 09, 2012

Extra registered players for championship

Out on loan

Transfers 2011-12

In

 

 
 
 

Total expenditure:  €500,000

Out

Total income:  €0

Foreign players

Teams in the Cypriot First Division can register up to eighteen non-EU nationals and players with European ancestry.

Active international players

UEFA Club rankings
This is the current UEFA Club Rankings, including season 2011–12.

Last update: March 24, 2012

PC = Position Changes

Friendly matches

Europa League matches

Cypriot Cup matches

Cypriot First Division

Squad statistics

Goals

Disciplinary record

 

 
 
 
 
 
 
 
 
 
 
|-
! colspan="2" | Players !! 18 !! Card totals 
!67!!2!!2!!8!!!!!!7!!!!!!!!!!!!82!!2!!2!!

 4  one match ban
 6  one match ban
 8  one match ban
 10  one match ban
 12+  one match ban per card
 1+1  one match ban -  1-4 match ban
 Ricardo Laborde  (3 match ban)
 Jan Rezek  (3 match ban)

Most Valuable Players

Last updated: 2 April 2012
Source:

Top 5 Players Rankings

Goals - Assist
Championship = 1.5 Points
Europa League = 1.5 Points
Cypriot Cup = 1 Points
Times MVP = 1*Times

See also

 2011–12 Cypriot First Division
 2011–12 UEFA Europa League
 2011–12 Cypriot Cup

References

Anorthosis Famagusta F.C. seasons
Anorthosis Famagusta
Anorthosis